Dendroseris neriifolia is a species of flowering plant in the family Asteraceae. It is a tree with droopy, elongated leaves and small yellow-white flowers.
The plant was originally native to Continental Chile but is now found only on Robinson Crusoe Island. The plant is endangered and very rare: only two specimens are known to exist in a ravine in the eastern part of the island, although there exist other human-cultivated specimens.  It is classified as critically endangered by the World Conservation Monitoring Centre.

References

neriifolia
Flora of Chile
Critically endangered plants
Robinson Crusoe Island
Taxonomy articles created by Polbot